The Family Business is an American crime family drama created by Carl Weber and based on his bestselling crime drama book series. Originally developed as an independent film franchise, BET produced it as an eight-episode limited series in 2018.

The series follows the Duncans, an upstanding family that owns and operates an exotic car dealership in New York. It stars Ernie Hudson, Valarie Pettiford and Armand Assante.

Cast and characters
Ernie Hudson as L.C. Duncan - L.C. Duncan is the patriarch and CEO of the Duncan Family business: Duncan Motors. Known as a no nonsense affluent businessman in the legitimate and underworld, L.C.'s reputation precedes him. However it's finally time to sit back and enjoy life with his wife and grand children so he has finally decided it's time to pass on the mantle of leadership.  
Valerie Pettiford as Charlotte Duncan - The stunning Duncan matriarch who keeps the family together no matter what the challenges are. She can be sweet as pie yet tough as nails and her love for her husband and family can never be challenged.  
Armand Assante as Sal Dash - Mafia crime boss and close ally to the Duncan family. Sal has a major concern with certain changes that are happening within the Duncan family as well as a purchase he made with L.C. Duncan.          
Darrin Henson as Orlando Duncan - Orlando is the handsome, smart and edgy, newly appointed CEO of Duncan Motors. His new appointment comes not only as a surprise but with jealousy and controversy despite his workaholic tendencies.
Emilio Rivera as Alejandro Zuniga - Alejandro is a savvy Mexican crime boss in Los Angeles who is the leader of Zuniga Cartel and is a longtime foe of the Duncan family. He's trying to mend fences through his son but the jury is still out on whether he plans on stabbing them in the back.
Yadi Rivera as Consuela Zuniga - Alejandro's hot and fierce wife and mother of Miguel. Known as "La Madrina", she is as cruel, brutal and bloody as her husband and cartel boss, Alejandro.
Carlos Sotelo as Miguel Zuniga - Miguel is the sharp-suited attractive son of Mexican crime Boss Alejandro Zuniga. He emerges with an opportunity that could save the Duncans from disaster but only if he can resist the temptation of their youngest daughter, Paris.
Javicia Leslie as Paris Duncan - Paris is the youngest daughter of the Duncan family. A glamorous spoiled party girl who always gets what she wants and knows how to handle herself in any situation. She's educated, seductive and knows how to handle a gun. 
Miguel A. Núñez Jr. as Harris Grant - Harris is the husband of the Duncans' oldest daughter London and the Duncan family lawyer and fixer. He has his hands in most of the family business dealings and was the most surprised when L.C. passed him up for Orlando to run the family business.
Tami Roman as London Duncan-Grant - London is the oldest daughter and mother of Mariah & Maria. She's appears to be a home body for the most part but London has many tantalizing secrets of her own.   
Sean Ringgold as Junior Duncan - The oldest of the Duncan children and as large as any professional football player. Junior is the family's security specialist. No mater what the situation is, he is willing to do whatever it takes to protect his family. 
Arrington Foster as Rio Duncan - Paris's flamboyant twin brother who manages a popular club & lounge in New York City. Rio is willing to do whatever he can to prove to his father that he deserves the same respect as his brothers.
KJ Smith as Sasha Duncan - Paris and Rio's lustful cousin and a hot woman of the Duncan family. Like her cousin Paris, she is intelligent, manipulative, beautiful, sexy, knows how to seduce and eliminate people like no one else.
Dylan Weber as Nevada Duncan - The teenage son of Vegas and heir to the Duncan leadership. Nevada is the only grandson being groomed to run the Duncan family business.
Clifton Powell as Uncle Lou Duncan - Lou is L.C.'s brother and partner. While L.C. is the face of Duncan Motors, Lou and his crew are the ones who get their hands dirty both under the hood of cars and in the streets.   
Kimberly Patterson as Ruby - Ruby is a young woman from Jamaica, who found herself in an unforeseen circumstance where she had to step up to the plate for her family by signing up with an escorting agency. With her first client being Orlando Duncan (the heir to the family's car and drug business), she managed to steal his heart unexpectedly. 
Michael Jai White as Vegas Duncan - Vegas is the wise and mysterious missing brother of the Duncan family. He is respected by all but his whereabouts are known to few.
Stan Shaw as Larry Duncan, L.C.’s older brother who was held at a mental institution and blames L.C. and his family for his hospitalization. He has been plotting his escape and revenge for years. (Season 3-4)
Sheila E. as Maude, owner of one of the nation’s most exclusive Manicure Spas which fronts for a money laundering operation. (Season 3)
Denise Boutte as Raven Bonclair, cunning and gorgeous baby momma of a high-ranking Duncan family associate. (Season 3-4)
Erica Joy as Holly, Brother X's New Love Interest. (Season 4) 

Christian Keyes, Brely Evans, Eva LaRue, Robert Picardo, Eric Lee Huffman, Anthony Montgomery, Katie Callaway, Franky G and Treach have appeared in guest starring roles.

Episodes

Season 1 (2018–19)

Season 2 (2020)

Season 3 (2021)

Season 4 (2022)

Production
On December 19, 2019, the series was renewed for a 12-episode second season to air on the network's streaming service BET+.  On December 4, 2020, the series was renewed for a third season On January 28, 2022, the series was renewed for a fourth season.

Release
The first season premiered on November 13, 2018. The second season premiered on July 2, 2020. The third season premiered on October 14, 2021. The fourth season was originally premiered on July 28, 2022. However, the fourth season premiered on September, 1, 2022

References

External links

2010s American black television series
2010s American crime drama television series
2018 American television series debuts
2020s American black television series
2020s American crime drama television series
BET original programming
BET+ original programming
English-language television shows
Television series about families
Television shows set in New York City
Works about Mexican drug cartels